North Buncombe High School is a public high school in Weaverville, North Carolina accommodating over 1000 students in grades 9–12. The school's mascot is the Black Hawk and the school principal is Samantha Sircey.

North Buncombe High School was built after the decision to build larger schools and a $5.5 million bond that county voters approved. William B. Brackett designed the $658,000 building housing 200 students, which opened August 26, 1954 on 31 acres, the first to open under the new plan. Barnardsville, Flat Creek, Red Oak, French Broad High Schools became K–8 schools and Weaverville High School became Weaverville Middle School (grades 7'8). In 1987, a new school opened on the former site of Asheville-Weaverville Speedway.  The old high school building then became North Buncombe Middle School.

North Buncombe High School houses the DeBruhl auditorium. The marching band has won numerous awards.

Notable alumni
 Chris Rodrigues, Contemporary Christian music singer, songwriter, multi-instrumentalist
 Nate Torbett, professional soccer player

References

External links 
 North Buncombe High School webpage
 Great Schools''

Public high schools in North Carolina
Schools in Buncombe County, North Carolina